Whike is a brand of recumbent tricycles with a sail, manufactured in the Netherlands.

It can be legally used on both bike lanes and streets in the Netherlands and UK. Activating the front brake releases the sail's spinlock, assuring there will be no more wind-propulsion.

Features 
The Whike features a three piece aluminium mast that can be stowed away on board when not needed. It is also equipped with 18 gears. To maintain responsive stopping the trike is fitted with disc brakes on all wheels. The cycle also has a handbrake. The Whike weighs   including the sail and can carry a maximum weight of  including luggage. Additionally, the sail can aid visibility of the cycle.

Additional features:
Three-wheeled recumbent with  sail
Propulsion by wind and Pedal Power
Top speed 
Sail operated through pulley and spinlock mainsheet system
Sail released automatically by any braking action
Mast can be removed for storage or transport
luggage rack

It is recommended to ride a Whike only with a helmet, having a load of at least , to use a smaller sail at wind speeds over 5 bft (at more than ) and not use any sail with wind speeds over 6 bft (at more than ).

Availability 
The Whike is sold directly to customers and is also available from some specialist suppliers. The Whike costs around €3500 for customers in the Netherlands (2010) with accessories available for additional cost.

See also 
 Outline of cycling
 List of motorized trikes
 Tricycle
 Land sailing

References

External links
Official website
Photographs of Whike-test drives.
Treehugger article on the Whike
BBC Article on the Whike
newspaper article

Bicycles
Tricycles
Sailing